Dorsum Scilla is a wrinkle ridge at  in Oceanus Procellarum on the Moon. It is 108 km long and was named after Agostino Scilla in 1976.

References

Scilla